The Women's 30 kilometre classical competition at the FIS Nordic World Ski Championships 2023 was held on 4 March 2023.

Results
The race was started at 12:00.

References

Women's 30 kilometre classical